Shcherbachyovka is a rural locality (a settlement) in Chernavskoye Rural Settlement, Paninsky District, Voronezh Oblast, Russia. The population was 181 as of 2010. There are 4 streets.

Geography 
Shcherbachyovka is located 35 km northeast of Panino (the district's administrative centre) by road. Khitrovka is the nearest rural locality.

References 

Rural localities in Paninsky District